Patissodes is a monotypic moth genus of the family Crambidae described by George Hampson in 1919. Its only species, Patissodes fulvinotata, described by the same author in the same year, is found in Singapore.

References

Pyraustinae
Monotypic moth genera
Crambidae genera
Taxa named by George Hampson